The Leucosyri (from , or Λευκοσύριοι / Leucosyroi, or Leucosyrioi), also known as Leuco-Syrians (Leucosyrians) or White Syrians, were an ancient people in central Anatolia, during the period of Classical Antiquity. The name "Leucosyrian" is an alternative name given by Greek writers to the inhabitants of Cappadocia. They lived in the regions of Cappadocia, Cilicia, Pontus, and other parts of central Asia Minor. They were mentioned by ancient Greek geographer and historian Strabo (d. in 24 CE) in his "Geography". During the later Hellenistic period, they were eventually hellenised. In Greek language, term Leuco-Syri means: White Syrians. During the Mithridatic Wars, the Leucosyrians were recruited as mercenaries into the Pontic army to fight off the Roman army of Sulla and later Pompey.

See also 

 Cappadocia
 Anatolia
 Pontus (region)
 Syria (region)
 Names of Syria

References

Sources 

 
 

Anatolian peoples
Hittites
Syro-Hittite states
Ancient Syria
Indo-European peoples
Cappadocia